Hyalenna is a genus of clearwing (ithomiine) butterflies described by William Trowbridge Merrifield Forbes in 1942. They are in the brush-footed butterfly family, Nymphalidae.

Species
Arranged alphabetically:
Hyalenna alidella (Hewitson, 1869)
Hyalenna buckleyi Lamas & Willmott, 2005
Hyalenna paradoxa (Staudinger, [1884])
Hyalenna pascua (Schaus, 1902)
Hyalenna perasippe (Hewitson, 1877)
Hyalenna sulmona (Hewitson, 1877)

References 

Ithomiini
Nymphalidae of South America
Nymphalidae genera
Taxa named by William Trowbridge Merrifield Forbes